Muanza District is a district of Sofala Province in Mozambique. The principal town is Muanza. The district is located in the center of the province, and borders with Cheringoma District in the north, Dondo District in the south, Nhamatanda District in the southwest, and with Gorongosa District in the northwest. In the east, the district is bordered by the Indian Ocean. It has a population of 25,229 as of 2007.

Geography
The principal rivers in the district are the Chineziwa River, the Sambanzou River, the Muanza River, and the Urema River.

History
The population of the district is mostly nomadic. The district was established in 1980.

Demographics
As of 2005, 42% of the population of the district was younger than 15 years. 18% did speak Portuguese. The most common mothertongue is Cindau. 85% were analphabetic, mostly women.

Administrative divisions
The district is divided into two postos, Muanza and Galinha, which comprise in total three localities.

Economy
Less than 1% of the households in the district have access to electricity.

Agriculture
In the district, there are 3,000 farms which have on average  of land. The main agricultural products are corn, cassava, cowpea, peanut, sorghum, pearl millet, sweet potato, and rice.

Transportation
Public transportation does not exist.

References

Districts in Sofala Province
States and territories established in 1980